Hassan Yousef may refer to:

 Hassan Yousef (Hamas leader) (born 1955), leader of Hamas in the West Bank
 Hassan Youssef (actor) (born 1934), Egyptian actor and director
 Hassan Youssef (Egyptian footballer) (born 1993), Egyptian footballer forAswan SC
 Hassan Yousef (Emirati footballer) (born 1992), Emirati footballer for Ittihad Kalba